Once Removed may refer to:

 episode in Series 4 of Inside No. 9
 a novel by Andrew Unger
 a 2012 documentary entitled First Cousin Once Removed
 a cousin with one removal in terms of generational separation